John R. Devitt (August 13, 1917 – January 31, 2000) was an American lawyer and politician.

Born in Milwaukee, Wisconsin, Devitt graduated from Marquette University High School in 1935. He then received his bachelor's degree from Marquette University and his law degree from Marquette Law School. He then practiced law in Milwaukee, Wisconsin. He served in the United States Army during World War II. In 1945, Devitt served in the Wisconsin State Senate as a Republican. In 1955, Devitt served in the Milwaukee County legal office. Devitt died in Milwaukee, Wisconsin.

Notes

1917 births
2000 deaths
Politicians from Milwaukee
Military personnel from Wisconsin
Marquette University alumni
Marquette University Law School alumni
Wisconsin lawyers
Republican Party members of the Wisconsin State Assembly
20th-century American politicians
20th-century American lawyers
Marquette University High School alumni